Prigent is a surname. Notable people with the surname include:

Bastien and Henry Prigent, French/Breton sculptors
Denez Prigent, (born 1966), French/Breton folk singer-songwriter
Jean-Yves Prigent, French slalom canoeist
Neil Prigent, (born 1964), English cricketer
Robert Prigent (1910-1995), French politician

See also
Marie-Françoise Grange-Prigent, French slalom canoeist
Loïk Le Floch-Prigent, (born 1943), French engineer and businessman
François Tanguy-Prigent, (1909–1970), French politician and resistance fighter

Breton-language surnames